Şaban, Son of Şaban is a 1977 Turkish comedy film directed by Ertem Eğilmez.

Cast 
 Kemal Sunal - Şaban
 Şener Şen - Hüsamettin
 Halit Akçatepe - Ramazan
 Sıtkı Akçatepe - Nazır Paşa
 Şevket Altuğ - Yunus Kaptan
 Adile Naşit - Hala/Tavuk Teyze
 Ayşen Gruda - Safinaz

External links 

1977 films
1970s historical comedy films
Films set in Turkey
Cross-dressing in film
Turkish historical comedy films
Films shot in Istanbul
Films set in the Ottoman Empire
1970s Turkish-language films